MZF1 antisense RNA 1 is a protein that in humans is encoded by the MZF1-AS1 gene.

References

Further reading 

Human proteins